Gunilla Wahlén (born 1951) is a Swedish Left Party politician. She was a member of the Riksdag from 1998 to 2010.

External links
Gunilla Wahlén at the Riksdag website

1951 births
Living people
Members of the Riksdag from the Left Party (Sweden)
Women members of the Riksdag
Academic staff of Mid Sweden University
Members of the Riksdag 1998–2002
Members of the Riksdag 2002–2006
Members of the Riksdag 2006–2010
21st-century Swedish women politicians
20th-century Swedish women politicians